Ruel Milton Johnson (June 5, 1836 – November 12, 1901) was an American soldier who fought in the American Civil War. Johnson received the Medal of Honor, his country's highest award for bravery in combat, for his extraordinary heroism at the Battle of Missionary Ridge on November 25, 1863, while a major in temporary command of the 100th Regiment, Indiana Volunteer Infantry. He was honored with the award on August 24, 1896. Johnson was later promoted to lieutenant colonel, and commanded the 100th Indiana from May 2, 1865, until it was mustered out on June 8, 1865.  After the Civil War, Johnson worked as a lawyer, and died in 1901 in Goshen, Indiana.

Johnson was born in Harborcreek Township in Erie County, Pennsylvania, and graduated from the University of Michigan in 1858.

Medal of Honor citation

See also
List of American Civil War Medal of Honor recipients: G–L

References

1843 births
1901 deaths
American Civil War recipients of the Medal of Honor
American lawyers
People from Erie County, Pennsylvania
People from Goshen, Indiana
People of Indiana in the American Civil War
Union Army officers
United States Army Medal of Honor recipients
University of Michigan alumni
Military personnel from Pennsylvania